Admont is a town in the Austrian state of Styria. It is historically most notable for Admont Abbey, a monastery founded in 1074.

Gesäuse National Park, in which Admont lies, is an area of outstanding beauty. The town is situated in the middle of the Ennstal Alps, in the valley of the Enns River.

Geography

References

External links
 Official site

Cities and towns in Liezen District